Hellinsia cuculla is a moth of the family Pterophoridae. It is found in Ecuador.

The wingspan is 16 mm. The forewings are pale ochreous and the marking are brown. The hindwings and fringes are brown-grey. Adults are on wing in April, at an altitude of 2,030 m.

Etymology
The name cuculla (meaning cap) reflects the shape of the saccular process in the right valve.

References

Moths described in 2011
cuculla
Moths of South America